Bycz may refer to the following places in Poland:

Bycz, Kuyavian-Pomeranian Voivodeship
Bycz, Lubusz Voivodeship